As of 2015, there are at least two translations of the Tirukkural available in the Polish language.

History of translations
The first Polish translation of the Kural text was made in prose in 1958 by Wandy Dynowskiej Umadevi, published by the Indo-Polish Library (Biblioteka Polsko-Indyjska). It was only a partial translation. During the same year, a parallel edition by the same translator appeared in Poland. A verse translation was made by Bohdan Gębarski, published in 1977 under the title Tirukkural. Święta księga południowych Indii. It is a complete translation. It was published again in 1998.

Translations

See also
 Tirukkural translations
 List of Tirukkural translations by language

References

Bibliography
 Gębarski, B. (1998). Tirukkural. Święta księga południowych Indii. Europa. Pp. 152. . Available from http://wysylkowa.com/ks414573.html

External links
 

Polish
Translations into Polish